Teddy Boy is an EP by French electro house artist Kavinsky released on January 16, 2006.

Track listing
 "Testarossa Autodrive" – 3:38
 "Testarossa Autodrive" (Mr. Oizo Autodrive T42) – 3:21
 "Transistor" – 1:23
 "The Crash" – 1:48
 "Testarossa Nightdrive" – 3:27
 "Testarossa Autodrive" (Arpanet Nightdrive Rework) – 3:45
 "Ghost Transistor" – 4:14

Charts

References

External links
https://www.discogs.com/Kavinsky-Teddy-Boy-EP/master/188632

2006 EPs
Kavinsky EPs